or  or  is a manga and superhero anime created in 1963 by science fiction writer Kazumasa Hirai and manga artist Jiro Kuwata. 8 Man is considered Japan's earliest cyborg superhero, pre-dating Kamen Rider. 

The manga was published in Weekly Shōnen Magazine and ran from 1963 to 1966. The anime series was produced by Eiken in association with TCJ Animation Center. It was broadcast on Tokyo Broadcasting System and ran from November 17, 1963, to December 31, 1964, with a total of 56 episodes, as well as a "farewell" special episode, "Goodbye, 8 Man".

Plot
Detective Yokoda is murdered by criminals and his body is retrieved by Professor Tani. Tani takes the body to his laboratory where he attempts to transfer Yokoda's life force into an android body, an experiment that has already failed seven times. Yokoda is reborn as the armour-skinned android 8 Man and is able to dash at impossible speeds as well as shape-shift into other people. He takes on his former body, this time taking on the name "Hachiro Azuma." He keeps this identity a secret, known only to Tani and his police boss, Chief Tanaka. Even his girlfriend Sachiko and his friend Ichiro are not aware that he is an android. As 8-Man, Hachiro fights crime–eventually avenging his own murder. To rejuvenate his powers, he smokes "energy" cigarettes that he carries in a case on his belt.

In Japan, the character's origin varies significantly between the original manga, the TV series, and the live-action movie. In the original Japanese manga and TV series, the character's name does not change when he is reborn as 8 Man. The "Detective Yokoda" name was created for the live-action version. In the manga, Detective Azuma is trapped in a warehouse and gunned down, while the TV series has him killed when he is run over by a car. In contrast, the original Japanese version had the main character named as "8 Man", as he is considered an extra member of the Japanese police force. There are seven regular police precincts and 8 Man is treated as an unofficial eighth precinct.

The Japanese manga was presented as serial novella stories along with a set of one-shot stories. Many of these stories were edited down and adapted for the TV series. The novella stories were originally printed every week in Shukuu Shōnen Magazine in 16-page increments that consisted of 15 story pages and one title page. Ten additional one-shot stories were presented in seasonal and holiday specials of Shuukuu Shōnen Magazine. These stories were generally between 30 and 40 pages in length.

In the North American version of the series, the resurrected detective/android is known as "Tobor"  - the word "robot" spelled backwards. Tani is referred to as "Professor Genius" and the sobriquet of 8-Man is slightly changed to "8th-Man," the name explained as he is the 8th attempt to be a super-robot. The story content was directed toward a wider audience of both young and adult viewers. As such, much of the violence was toned down for Western audiences.

Original Japanese manga story titles

Novella stories
怪人ゲーレン (Kaijin Geren) - Galen, the Mystery Man
サタンの兄弟 (Satan no Kyodai) - Satan's Brothers
怪力ロボット007 (Kairiki Robotto 007) - Strange Powered Robot 007
光線兵器レーザー (Kosen Heiki Reza) - The Laser Beam Gun
超人サイバー (Chojin Saiba) - Cyber, the Superhuman
人間ミサイル (Ningen Misairu) - The Human Missile
殺人ロボット005 (Satsujin Robotto 005) - Murderous Robot 005
魔女エスパー (Majo Esupa) - Esper, the Witch
超人類ミュータント (Chojinrui Myutanto) - Superhuman Mutant
魔人コズマ (Majin Kozuma) - The Demon Kozuma
 The strip's artist Jiro Kuwata was imprisoned for possession of a handgun before the final 16-page serial of "The Demon Kozuma" was completed. The final serial was drawn by Takaharu Kusunoki for the magazine version. Jiro Kuwata later redrew the final pages of the story himself by request of Kazumasa Hirai and Rim Publishing, so that they could publish a complete version of the final story. The publishers were not able to use Kusunoki's artwork, so the story was omitted or left incomplete in previous official releases

Short episode stories
死刑囚タランチュラ - The Condemned Criminal Tarantula
決闘 - The Duel
シャドウ・ボクサー - Shadow Boxer
復讐鬼ゴースト - Vengeful Demon Ghost
超振動砲 - The Super Vibration Gun
マッド・マシン - Mad Machine
サイボーグPV1号 - Cyborg Number PV1
殺し屋イライジャ - The Assassin Elijah
燃える水 - Burning Water
幽霊ハイウェイ - Phantom Highway
太陽衛星サンダー (単行本未収録) - Solar Satellite "Thunder" (unreleased story)
 This was intended as a lead-in to a series of 23 manga stories adapted from the TV series.

Original Japanese TV series episode titles
 エイトマン登場 - Introducing Eightman
 殺し屋ゲーレン - Galen, the Hitman
 サタンの兄弟 - Satan's Brother
 死刑台B3 - The B3 Gallows
 暗黒カプセル - The Darkness Capsule
 黄金ギャング - The Gold Gang
 消音ジェット機 - The Stealth Jetplane
 超小型ミサイル - The Ultra Micro Missile
 光線銃レーザー - The Lazer Ray Gun
 ロボット007 - Robot 007
 まぼろしの暗殺者 - The Phantom Assassin
 海底のウラン - The Undersea Uranium
 人間パンチカード - The Human Punch Card
 スーパーパイロット - The Super Pilot
 黒い幽霊 - The Black Ghost
 怪盗黄金虫 - Goldbeetle, the Mysterious Thief
 超音波ドクター - The Ultrasonic Wave Doctor
 台風男爵 - The Typhoon Baron
 ゲーレンの逆襲 - Galen Strikes Again
 スパイ指令100号 - Spy Directive No. 100
 ロボットタイガー - The Robot Tiger
 ゼロへの挑戦 - Challenge to Zero
 ナポレオン13世 - Napoleon the 13th
 サラマンダー作戦 - Operation: Salamander
 超人サイバー - Cyber, the Superhuman
 地球ゼロアワー - Zero Hour: Earth
 大怪物イーラ - Eeler, the Giant Monster
 バクテリア作戦 - Operation: Bacteria
 人間ミサイル - The Human Missile
 サイボーグ人間C1号 - Cyborg No. C1
 幽霊ハイウェイ - The Phantom Highway
 太陽衛星サンダー - Thunder, the Solar Satellite
 人工生命ヴァルカン - Vulcan, the Artificial Lifeform
 決闘 - The Duel
 冷凍光線 - The Freeze Ray
 バイラス13号 - Virus No. 13
 悪夢の7日間 - The 7 Day Nightmare
 怪人ゴースト - The Mysterious Ghost
 まぼろしを作る少年 - The Boy Who Made a Phantom
 透明ロボット・ジュピター - Jupiter, the Invisible Robot
 エイトマン暗殺指令 - Order: Assassinate Eightman
 女王蜂モンスター - The Queen Bee Monster
 魔女エスパー - Esper, the Witch
 世界電撃プラン - The World Blitz Plan
 死刑囚タランチュラ - Tarantula, the Condemned Criminal
 空飛ぶ魔人 - The Flying Devil
 バブル・ボール作戦 - Operation: Bubble Ball
 火星人SAW - SAW, the Martian
 30億人の人質 - 3 Billion Hostages
 怪像ジャイアント - Giant, the Mysterious Statue
 狙われた地球 - Target Earth
 人喰魚ピラニア - The Man-Eating Piranha
 ムタールの反乱 - Moutard's Rebellion
 シャークの掟 - Law of the Shark
 超人類ミュータント(前編) - Superhuman Mutant (Part One)
 超人類ミュータント(後編) - Superhuman Mutant (Part Two)
 "Good-Bye Eight-Man" - a special look back at the TV series.

The U.S. syndicated version
In 1965, 8 Man was brought to the U.S. as 8th Man (sometimes called "Tobor the 8th Man," as in its English-language theme music), with ABC Films as its syndicated distributor. Only 52 of the original 56 episodes were translated into English.

The characters were renamed as follows:
 Yokota/Azuma/8 Man - Special Agent Brady/Tobor ("robot" spelled backward)/8th Man
 Tani - Professor Genius
 Tanaka - Chief Fumble Thumbs
 Sachiko - Jenny Hartsweet
 Ichiro - Skip

Theme song
Call Tobor, the 8 Man

Reception
8 Man was ranked ninth in the Mania Entertainment's 10 Most Iconic Anime Heroes. The author of the ranking, Thomas Zoth, commented, "Before Cyborg 009, The Six Million Dollar Man, and RoboCop, there was 8 Man: The first cyborg manga and anime hero. Building on Astro Boy, 8 Man helped to shape the trajectory of robot and cyborg heroes for the next decade."

Legacy
The 8 Man franchise was revived in the early 1990s with a live-action film, video game, and new animated series.

Video game 
In 1991, SNK released a video game edition of Eight Man for the Neo Geo arcade and home video game system (both versions are identical), where the player took the role of 8 Man and his Robo-comrade 9 Man in a fight against an invading evil robot army. The game was released internationally. While the game stayed true to the concept of a crime-fighting super-robot, it was widely criticized for being tedious and relying too much on the gimmick of its speed-running effect.

In 2009, he appeared in the crossover Shonen Sunday & Shonen Magazine White Comic for the Nintendo DS.

Live action movie

In 1992, a live-action film version of 8 Man was produced in Japan. Titled Eitoman - Subete no Sabishī Yoru no Tame ni (lit. 8 Man - For All the Lonely Nights), it was directed by Yasuhiro Horiuchi and starred Kai Shishido as the title character and Toshihide Wakamatsu as Detective Yokota.  Distributed in the United States by Fox Lorber video simply as 8 Man, the movie was widely panned for its choppy editing, mediocre direction, and low-budget feel. Many modern American viewers, unfamiliar with the older animated series, felt the movie was an inferior version of RoboCop, although the latter was a much more recent franchise.

8 Man After
In 1993, the mantle of 8 Man was taken up by Hazama Itsuru in the OVA series 8 Man After. Existing in a world far more corrupt than that of his predecessor, the new 8 Man had no qualms about being extremely violent towards the cybernetic criminals who had murdered him previously. It was licensed by Streamline Pictures where it went out of print until being released on DVD by Image Entertainment in 2001. It has since been released by Discotek Media in 2016 with Japanese audio, featuring English subtitles for the first time.

8 Man Infinity
A manga comic strip called   is being authored by Kyoichi Nanatsuki under Kodansha, which is being serialized under Kodansha's Magazine Z.

8 Man vs. Cyborg 009
A crossover between 8 Man and Cyborg 009 by Kyoichi Nanatsuki (script) and Masato Hayate (art), began serialization in Champion Red on July 18, 2020.

References
Notes

External links
  (1963)
  (1965)
  (1992)
  (1993)
 

1963 anime television series debuts
1963 manga
1987 films
1991 video games
1992 films
1993 anime OVAs
1994 manga
2005 manga
Anime and manga characters who can move at superhuman speeds
Arcade video games
Discotek Media
Eiken (studio)
Fictional cyborgs
Fictional Japanese police officers
Fictional robots
Fuji TV original programming
Japanese television dramas based on manga
J.C.Staff
Jiro Kuwata
Kazumasa Hirai (author)
Kodansha manga
Robot superheroes
Seinen manga
Shapeshifter characters in comics
Shōnen manga
TBS Television (Japan) original programming
Cyborgs in anime and manga
Television series about shapeshifting